John Lennon Silva Santos (born 29 December 1991), known as John Lennon or simply Lennon, is a Brazilian professional  footballer who plays for Caxias as a right back.

References

1991 births
Living people
Sportspeople from Tocantins
Brazilian footballers
Association football defenders
Campeonato Brasileiro Série A players
Campeonato Brasileiro Série B players
Campeonato Brasileiro Série D players
Madureira Esporte Clube players
Vila Nova Futebol Clube players
Anápolis Futebol Clube players
Botafogo de Futebol e Regatas players
Atlético Clube Goianiense players
Grêmio Esportivo Glória players
Club Sportivo Sergipe players
Esporte Clube Cruzeiro players
Cruzeiro Esporte Clube players
Centro Sportivo Alagoano players
Esporte Clube Pelotas players
Esporte Clube Juventude players